West End (also referred to as "Settlement Point") is the oldest town and westernmost settlement on the Bahamian island of Grand Bahama. It is the current capital of Grand Bahama, contrary to the popular belief that Freeport City is the capital of the island. It is also the third largest settlement in The Bahamas. There is one airport in West End, West End Airport, which serves mostly private aircraft. Since the 1950s, the settlement of West End has fluctuated with the rise and fall of the adjacent resort developments.

Early history 
The Bahamas were first inhabited by the Lucayan people in 500-800 AD. It is unknown if the Lucayan people inhabited West End specifically. However, after the arrival of Columbus and Spanish explorers, the Lucayan people became extinct by 1520.

Records from West End show that the population in 1836 was only about 370 people, many of whom later abandoned the island for greater opportunities in Nassau.  But in 1861 people flocked back to Grand Bahama because of an unexpected economic opportunity—the American Civil War.  At the outbreak of the war, with the Confederate States of America under a strict Union embargo, smugglers operating out of West End were able to command hefty prices from the South for goods such as cotton, sugar, and weapons. As soon as the war ended, the economic boom ended as well, but it established strong ties between the Bahamas and the United States that still exist.

A second smuggling boom came a few decades later when the 18th Amendment prohibited alcohol in the United States. West End achieved notoriety as a rum-running port during this prohibition. Warehouses, distilleries, bars, and supply stores sprang up all over West End. Eventually prohibition ended, the economy contracted and people started fishing again.

Fishing and tourism remain the two major industries of the West End economy.

Fishing
West End is known for its fishing.  The location allows sport fishing enthusiasts to easily access shallow or deep-water options within a few nautical miles.

The north side of the island is part of the Bahama Banks and has very shallow water, making it a popular destination for bonefishing. Legendary bonefish guide Israel Rolle, known as "Bonefish Folley", died in July 2012.  He guided bonefishing clients like Ernest Hemingway, Martin Luther King Jr., and Richard Nixon.  Local fishermen also catch mutton snapper, groupers, spiny lobster and conch. Northwest of West End is Memory Rock. Memory Rock is a large rock that is sticking out of the water in around 7-8 feet of water. Memory Rock is home to great spearfishing and yellowtail snapper fishing. The depth around Memory Rock goes form 2,000 feet to 8 feet in under a mile. This makes for great wahoo trolling as well. In 100-40 feet has great grouper fishing. The shallower you get you can spearfish for mutton snapper, hogfish, spiny lobster (crawfish) and smaller groupers. In these shallow waters also sometimes hold conch. Conch is a shellfish that has a great taste when prepared correctly. The West End Settlement is known for its conch salad.

Around the tip of West End, the water on the south side of the island drops to a deep trench not far from the shoreline. The Gulf Stream runs through this trench, attracting big game fish to the smaller prey that are carried along. Offshore sport fishermen are drawn to the blue marlin, white marlin, yellow-fin and blue-fin tuna, sailfish, wahoo and dolphin (Mahi Mahi).

Tourism 
West End is only 55 nautical miles from the Florida coast and has a long history as a resort destination because of its accessibility. For most boaters entering Bahamian waters from the United States, it is the first port of call. West End is also serviced by the local West End Airport and Grand Bahama International Airport in Freeport.

Tourism and foreign investment have been attracted by the natural beauty of the beaches and water, the warm climate, British rule of law and a stable financial system (the currency is pegged to the US dollar).

Jack Tar Village 

Tourism first started on Grand Bahama Island in 1949 when an Englishman built a small holiday camp for his vacationing countrymen. The camp did not succeed, but by the late 1950s development in West End started to create the Jack Tar Village resort, which opened in 1960. This predates resorts in Freeport and Lucaya. The large 356-room resort had three 9-hole golf courses, 16 tennis courts, a half-million gallon salt water swimming pool (the Bahamas' largest), a huge auditorium for live shows, a shopping arcade, several restaurants, a 100-slip marina and an airport. The 10,000-foot runway received charter flights from as far away as the Midwest and, at its peak, several flights from Canada each week.

Jack Tar closed in the early 1990s and was partially demolished thereafter.

References

Grand Bahama
Populated places in the Bahamas